Benjamin Santos Abalos Sr. (born September 21, 1934) is a Filipino politician who currently serves as the mayor of Mandaluyong, Metro Manila since 2022, a position he also held from 1986 to 1987 and from 1988 to 1998. He also served as a chairman of the Commission on Elections and chairman of the  MMDA. He is the father of former Mandaluyong mayor and Interior and Local Government Secretary Benjamin "Benhur" Abalos Jr.

Early life 
Abalos was born into a poor family in Pangasinan on September 21, 1934. He studied Economics at Ateneo de Manila University and graduated from the Manuel L. Quezon University in 1957. Abalos was admitted to the roll of attorneys of the Supreme Court in 1958 and then into the Integrated Bar of the Philippines in 1973. Abalos supported himself through college by taking several jobs, working as a janitor, factory worker, and a caddy at the Wack Wack Golf and Country Club.

Political career 
In 1963, Abalos ran for vice mayor of Mandaluyong, which was then a municipality of Rizal, and lost to the scion of a political family.

He ran for Mandaluyong mayor in 1980, losing to the candidate of former President Ferdinand Marcos. In 1986, shortly after Marcos was ousted through a popular uprising, President Corazon Aquino appointed him as Officer-in-Charge (OIC) of the then municipality of Mandaluyong.

As OIC of the town, he ran for the post of mayor and won in the local elections of 1988, the first local elections under the 1987 Constitution. He was re-elected two times in the elections of 1992 and 1995, making him one of the two Aquino OIC appointees who survived and secured the constitution-mandated three consecutive terms limit for local officials. Abalos made Mandaluyong's cityhood in 1994. In 1998, Abalos ran for congressman but lost to Neptali Gonzales II.

Abalos was a former member of the Laban ng Demokratikong Pilipino later joining the then newly formed Lakas NUCD-CMD.

Chairman of MMDA 
On January 20, 2001, Abalos was appointed chairman of the Metropolitan Manila Development Authority, a post he held until the following year.

Chairman of COMELEC 
On June 5, 2002, President Gloria Macapagal Arroyo appointed Abalos to replace Alfredo Benipayo after the latter failed to secure the confirmation of his appointment from the Commission on Appointments.

Impeachment complaint 
On September 27, 2007, Iloilo Vice Governor Rolex Suplico filed a 64-page impeachment complaint against Abalos, in his capacity as Commission on Elections Chairman, before the House of Representatives of the Philippines regarding the NBN–ZTE deal corruption scandal. It was endorsed by Representatives Teofisto Guingona III (Bukidnon–2nd), Teodoro Casiño (Bayan Muna), and Representative Ma. Isabelle Climaco (Zamboanga City–1st). Affidavits from Romulo Neri and Jose de Venecia III supported the complaint. On October 1, 2007, Abalos resigned during a press conference; and Resurreccion Borra would be appointed as Acting Chairman.

Return as Mayor of Mandaluyong 
Abalos ran for mayor of Mandaluyong in 2022 under PDP-Laban, with his daughter-in-law, incumbent mayor Menchie Abalos, as his running mate for vice mayor. He said that he would run to fulfill his promise to his deceased wife that he would spend his remaining years serving the people of Mandaluyong. He won the elections in a landslide victory, securing a comeback as mayor after 24 years.

Personal life 
He married Corazon de Castro in 1960 with whom he has five children, including Benjamin Abalos Jr., the incumbent Secretary of the Interior and Local Government who also served as  mayor of Mandaluyong and Metro Manila Development Authority chairman. His wife died on January 25, 2021, due to severe sepsis, secondary to pneumonia caused by COVID-19.

References 

1934 births
Living people
People from Pangasinan
Chairpersons of the Metropolitan Manila Development Authority
Mayors of Mandaluyong
PDP–Laban politicians
Lakas–CMD (1991) politicians
Chairpersons of the Commission on Elections of the Philippines
Arroyo administration personnel
Ateneo de Manila University alumni
Manuel L. Quezon University alumni